Linc's is an American comedy-drama television series created by Tim Reid and Susan Fales-Hill. The series starred Steven Williams, Pam Grier and Golden Brooks, and was set in a bar in Washington, D.C. It aired on Showtime for two seasons from August 1998 to February 2000. After its cancellation, it was briefly syndicated on Showtime's former sister network BET.

Cast

Main
Steven Williams as Russell A. "Linc" Lincoln, the owner of Linc's Bar & Grill. He is a widowed Republican and post-Vietnam Army veteran.
Golden Brooks as CeCe Jennings, an outspoken waitress at Linc's and a single mother
Joe Inscoe as Harlan Hubbard IV, Chief of Staff for the Republican Senator of Mississippi
Pam Grier as Eleanor Braithwaite Winthrop, the firm, charismatic head of the National Organization for Children
Georg Stanford Brown as Johnnie B. Goode, a money-hungry D.C. lobbyist

Recurring
Adewale Akinnuoye-Agbaje as Winston Iwelu, a Nigerian cab driver
Daphne Maxwell Reid as Eartha, a prostitute
Randy J. Goodwin as Dante Harrison
Tisha Campbell as Rosalee Lincoln, Linc's daughter, an infantry lieutenant who is at a crossroads with her sexuality

Episodes

Season 1 (1998–99)

Season 2: 1999–2000

Production
Linc's was the first television series to be filmed at Tim Reid's New Millennium Studios in Petersburg, Virginia. Filming for the first season took place from May to August 1998.

Awards
In 1999, Linc's was nominated for a GLAAD Media Award for Outstanding TV Drama Series, and Pam Grier was nominated for a NAACP Image Award for Outstanding Lead Actress in a Comedy Series for her role as Eleanor Braithwaite Winthrop. 
In 2000, at the NAACP Image Awards, Linc's was nominated for Outstanding Comedy Series, Pam Grier was nominated for Outstanding Actress in a Comedy Series, and Steven Williams was nominated for Outstanding Actor in a Comedy Series.

References

External links
 

1990s American black television series
2000s American black television series
1990s American comedy-drama television series
2000s American comedy-drama television series
1998 American television series debuts
2000 American television series endings
English-language television shows
Fictional drinking establishments
Showtime (TV network) original programming
Television series by CBS Studios
Television series set in restaurants
Television shows filmed in Virginia
Television shows set in Washington, D.C.